Dušan Kalmančok (born 1945) is a Slovak astronomer and co-discoverer of minor planets.

He is credited by the Minor Planet Center with the discovery of 7 asteroids between 1996 and 2000, and significantly contributed to the establishment of the Modra Observatory, Slovakia, in 1988. Kalmančok has also been involved in elaborating its observational programs to study the Sun and interplanetary matter.

The outer main-belt asteroid 29824 Kalmančok, discovered by astronomers Leonard Kornoš and Juraj Tóth at Modra, was named in his honor on 7 April 2005.

References

External links 
 Dušan Kalmančok and Juraj Tóth at Modra Observatory (Gallery)

1945 births
Discoverers of asteroids

Living people
Slovak astronomers